This article shows all participating team squads at the 2009 Men's NORCECA Volleyball Championship, held from October 12 to October 17 at the Coliseo Rubén Rodríguez in Bayamón, Puerto Rico.











References

External links
 Team compositions

N
N